The following is a list of the 100 largest lakes of the United States by normal surface area.  The top twenty lakes in size are as listed by the National Atlas of the United States, a publication of the United States Department of the Interior.  The area given is the normal or average area of the lake. The area of some lakes fluctuates substantially.  For those lakes partially in Canada or Mexico the area given for the lake is the total area, not just the part of the lake in the United States. Of the top 100 lakes, 55 are man-made and 45 are natural. Three lakes in the top 100 are primarily salt water.

See also

List of lakes of the United States
List of largest lakes of the United States by volume

Notes

External links
List from the National Atlas of the United States

Lakes
United States Largest Lakes
United States Largest Lakes